The Samsung Galaxy E7 is a midrange Android smartphone produced by Samsung Electronics. It was released in January 2015 & Discontinued in November 2016. Samsung Galaxy E7 has a 13 Megapixel rear camera with LED flash and a 5 Megapixel front facing camera.

Specifications

Hardware
The phone is powered by Qualcomm's Snapdragon 410 chipset which includes a 1.2 GHz processor, Adreno 306 GPU and 2GB RAM, with 16GB of internal storage. It also has a Lithium-ion battery with a capacity of 2950 mAh. The Samsung Galaxy E7 has a 5.5-inch HD Super AMOLED display and also includes a 13 MP rear camera and 5 MP front camera. It comes with two Nano-SIM slots, with one of them also serving as a microSD slot.

Software
This phone was officially released with Android 4.4.4 "KitKat". It is also upgradable to Android 5.1.1 "Lollipop".

References

Android (operating system) devices